Marty Munsch  is an American music producer and recording engineer who worked extensively with punk rock and post-punk as well as subgenre bands. His career has spanned over three decades.

Record production
Munsch founded Punk Rock Records in 1983 and Northern Front Records in 1987. He produced and released material by U.S. Chaos, Violent Society's Not Enjoyin' It. The Rise Of Punk

Production, post-production, engineering, and mastering
 2015   "When I'm Alone", The Antics: Producer, Engineer
 2014  "Send It Out", The Antics: Producer, Engineer
 2006  "Live at CBGB's", TSOL: Producer, Engineer

Film work
Munsch appears in the 2008 film All Grown Up: The Movie by Andrea Witting.

Munsch produced and mastered the U.S. Chaos song "For Being Young" which appears on the soundtrack of film Pariah.

References

External links 
 
 

American audio engineers
American record producers
Living people
Punk rock record producers
Year of birth missing (living people)